The 1992 NCAA Division I-AA football season, part of college football in the United States organized by the National Collegiate Athletic Association at the Division I-AA level, began on September 5, 1992, and concluded with the 1992 NCAA Division I-AA Football Championship Game on December 19, 1992, in Huntington, West Virginia. The Marshall Thundering Herd defeated the Youngstown State Penguins by a score of 31–28. It was the second consecutive year that Marshall and Youngstown State faced off in the I-AA title game.

Notable changes
Prior to the season, the Gateway Collegiate Athletic Conference, otherwise a women's sports league but sponsoring football as its only men's sport since the 1985 collapse of the football side of the Missouri Valley Conference (MVC), merged into the MVC. The football league became the standalone Gateway Football Conference, later renamed as the Missouri Valley Football Conference (MVFC) in 2008.

Conference changes

Conference standings

Conference champions
This is a listing of conference champions.

Postseason
Only the top four teams in the field were seeded, and thus assured of home games in their first-round games. The site of the title game, Marshall University Stadium, had been predetermined months before the playoffs began.

NCAA Division I-AA playoff bracket

* Next to team name denotes host institution

Source:

Final poll standings

References